Miroslav may refer to:

 Miroslav (given name), a Slavic masculine given name
 Young America (clipper) or Miroslav, an Austrian clipper ship in the Transatlantic case oil trade
 Miroslav (Znojmo District), a town in the Czech Republic

See also
 Miroslava (disambiguation)
 Mirosław (disambiguation)